Mortadella is a large Italian sausage or luncheon meat (salume ) made of finely hashed or ground heat-cured pork, which incorporates at least 15% small cubes of pork fat (principally the hard fat from the neck of the pig). It is traditionally flavoured with black pepper grains, but modern versions can also contain pistachios or, more rarely, myrtle berries.

The best-known version of mortadella is Mortadella Bologna PGI, but other varieties are found across Italy, including some made of other meats.

Etymology
The origin of the name  is debated. One theory derives the name from the Latin word  (mortar), traditionally used to pound the meat to produce the sausage. This theory, proposed by Giancarlo Susini, professor of ancient history in the University of Bologna, relies on two funerary steles kept in the Archaeological Museum of Bologna, believed to pertain to the same monument, one showing a herd of piglets and the other a mortar and pestle.

Myrtle was in fact a popular spice before pepper became available to European markets.

History

Traditionally, the pork filling was ground to a paste using a large mortar and pestle.

Mortadella originated in Bologna, the capital of Emilia-Romagna. Anna Del Conte (The Gastronomy of Italy 2001) found a sausage mentioned in a document of the official body of meat preservers in Bologna dated 1376 that may be mortadella.

Varieties

In Italy
 Mortadella di Bologna has Protected Geographical Indication (PGI) status under European Union law and is the best known worldwide. The zone of production is extensive; as well as Emilia-Romagna and the neighbouring regions of Piedmont, Lombardy, Veneto, Marche, and Tuscany, it includes Lazio and Trentino.
 The American sausage called "bologna" is named after the mortadella of Bologna.
 Mortadella di Prato, produced in Tuscany (Prato), is also defined by an PGI. It is flavoured with pounded garlic and coloured with alchermes.
 Mortadella of Campotosto, high in the Apennines of northern Lazio, is lightly smoked.
 Mortadella di cavallo is made from horsemeat in Albano Laziale in Lazio.

Elsewhere

Ibero-American cultures

Mortadella is very popular in Spain and Portugal, where a variety with pepper and olives is widely consumed, especially in sandwiches.

Mortadella is also very popular in Argentina, Bolivia, Peru, Brazil, Ecuador, Chile, Colombia, Uruguay, and Venezuela, thanks to the Italian immigrants who settled in these countries in the early 20th century. In these countries, it is spelt , and its recipe is quite similar to the traditional Italian, with additional pepper grains.

In Puerto Rico, "smoked mortadella" is sometimes confused with commercial salami or with cooked salami because cafeterias, and restaurants buy the bulk of whole smoked mortadella. While salami may contain pork, beef, veal, and small pieces of fat uniformly distributed within the sausage, mortadella has the traditional larger chunks not so uniformly distributed. Its diameter is much larger than that of hard salami and more closely resembles  (cooked) in size, hence the confusion of some people. It is smaller in diameter than the traditional  de Bologna because the smoking process causes some shrinkage. It is best served at room temperature to bring out its rich flavour.

Central, Southern, and Eastern Europe
The term  is also often used in Bosnia-Herzegovina, while  is used in other territories of the Balkans. The classic Italian  is widely sold in supermarkets along the entire Adriatic coast.

In Poland,  slices are sometimes dipped in batter, fried, and served with potatoes and salads as a quicker (and cheaper) alternative to traditional pork cutlets.

Middle East and North Africa
In several countries, such as Morocco, Algeria, Egypt, Iran, Iraq, Syria, Lebanon, Jordan, Palestine, United Arab Emirates, Qatar, Saudi Arabia, Kuwait, and Israel, halal or kosher mortadella is sold, which is made from chicken, beef, or turkey. The Siniora brand, a Palestinian brand established in Jerusalem in 1920, is the first in the region, a mortadella with sliced olives, pistachios, or pepper. Lebanese  is a famous brand that is sold around the world. The most popular brands in the GCC are Americana Group and Halwani Brothers.
It is also popular in Iran, albeit usually made with beef or lamb, and called commonly , from Russian .

Pork mortadella is sold in Egypt, Lebanon, Jordan, Syria, and the UAE.

Canada and United States
A similar commercial sausage product that omits the cubes of pork fat called bologna is popular in Canada and the United States. A variety that includes olives and pimentos is called olive loaf.

Mortadella was banned from import into the United States from 1967 to 2000 due to an outbreak of African swine fever in Italy. This ban was a pivotal part of the plot of the 1971 film  starring Sophia Loren.

The ban in the United States was lifted due to the Veterinary equivalency Agreement that allowed countries to export products that had been shown to be disease-free as part of an overall agreement that would allow products deemed safe in the United States to be exported to the European Union.

Russia and former Soviet Union
In Russia, Ukraine, and other former Soviet states, a very similar product is called  (lit. "doctor's sausage"). Instead, it is flavoured with just cardamom, sometimes coriander and nutmeg, and also traditionally contains eggs and milk, which are usually absent in traditional mortadella. Unlike mortadella,   contains lower amounts of fat and is high in proteins.

The name "doctor's sausage" was coined in the Soviet Union in the 1930s to refer to sausages and meat products recommended by doctors to help with undernourishment and stomach problems. During the Soviet era, it was commonly advertised as being nutritious (due to its low-fat content) and remained popular throughout former Soviet states to the present day.

East Asia
 or Vietnamese mortadella is sometimes used as an accompaniment to the Vietnamese dish .

See also

 Curing (food preservation)
 Mortadella sandwich
 Pigs in culture

References

External links

 Consorzio Mortadella Bologna
 Istituto Valorizzazione Salumi Italiani (IVSI): Mortadella
 Carlo Cantoni and Patrizia Cattaneo, "La mortadella: aspetti attuali tecnici della sua produzione" 
 "Sausage Peddlers, Vagabonds, and Bandits: Part 1": types of Italian sausage, by Clifford A. Wright

Cuisine of Emilia-Romagna
Argentine cuisine
Chilean cuisine
Lunch meat
Croatian cuisine
Hungarian cuisine
Italian products with protected designation of origin
Italian sausages
Cooked sausages
Olive dishes